A Dot Com Mom (Marathi: "अ डॉट कॉम मॉम") is a 2016 Marathi language Family Drama film. It is directed by Dr. Meena Nerurkar, who also stars in the film with Vikram Gokhale, Vijay Chavan, Apurva Bhalerao, and Sai Gundewar. The movie was released in India in September 2016.

The movie is the first Marathi film to be filmed in the United States.

Synopsis
Sulbhatai, a struggling, middle-class mother from a small town in Maharashtra, India, works hard to raise her highly intelligent son, Sunil, who eventually moves to the United States and becomes a successful millionaire through his website. He invites his parents to visit him, but only his mother manages to come. Her son is excited and wants to show her around, but she cannot cope with the more modern culture of the United States. Sunil's wife, Seema, cannot bear her mother-in-law's presence in her house, so Sulbhatai decides to go back to India early. Months later, Sunil wants his mother to return to the United States. She is reluctant, but her husband insists that she return to help during Seema's labor. Having prepared for two months, Sulbhatai returns to the United States.

Starring

 Vikram Gokhale
 Dr. Meena Nerurkar as Sulba Chafekar
 Vijay Chavan
 Apurva Bhalerao
 Sai Gundewar
 Asha Shelar
 Dipti Lele
 Shriram Kolhatkar
 Dr. Deven Gabale
 Makarand Bhave
 Manasi Karandikar
 Seeyali Singh
 Dawn Scott
 Carrie Sullivan
 Rafael E. Dieppa
 Prashant Tapasvi
 Sanyogita Apte

Crew

References

External links

2016 films
Indian drama films
2010s Marathi-language films
2016 drama films